A Very British History is a British documentary television series that was broadcast on BBC Four. The four-part series explores migration to Britain in the 20th century and the shift in culture in various minority communities.

Production 
The series was commissioned by BBC Four Channel Editor Cassian Harrison and former Factual Commissioning Editor Clare Paterson.

Episodes

Critical reception 
The documentary series was praised for the engaging style of the presenters alongside calls for a second series to be commissioned. The series also provided a first-hand glimpse into the racism faced by immigrants to Britain in the 20th century. Additionally, it was noted that racism against minorities has not disappeared in the modern day.

Broadcast 
The series was originally broadcast on regional versions of BBC One.

See also
 Windrush scandal
 British Asian
 British Jews
 Black British
 Romani people
 Who Do You Think You Are (UK TV series)

References

External links
 

2018 British television series debuts
2019 British television series endings
2010s British reality television series
BBC television documentaries
English-language television shows